The 1900–01 United States collegiate men's ice hockey season was the 7th season of collegiate ice hockey.

Regular season

Standings

References

1900–01 NCAA Standings

External links
College Hockey Historical Archives

 
College